Las Guijas is a populated place situated in Pima County, Arizona, United States. The name, as with the nearby mountains of the same name, comes from 19th century Spanish miners referring  to las guijas for "the rubble" as the placer gold they were working occurred in the gravels or conglomerates along the stream valleys and gulches draining the range.

References

Populated places in Pima County, Arizona